Baṛī ye ( "greater ye") is a letter in the Urdu alphabet (and other Indic language alphabets based on the Nastaʿliq script) directly based on the alternative "returned" variant of the final form of the Arabic letter ye/yāʾ (known as yāʾ mardūda) found in the Hijazi, Kufic and Nastaʿliq scripts. It functions as the word-final yā-'e-majhūl ([]) and yā-'e-sākin ([]). It is distinguished from the "choṭī ye ( "lesser ye")", which is the regular Perso-Arabic yāʾ used elsewhere.

Character encoding

References

Arabic letters
Persian letters
Arabic calligraphy